Hylinae is a large subfamily of "tree frogs", family Hylidae.

Classification
The contents of this subfamily vary substantially according to the source. The Amphibian Species of the World follows the revision by Duellman and colleagues from 2016 based on molecular data and delimits the subfamily more narrowly than before, treating parts of former Hylinae as their own subfamilies. Following this classification, there were 18 genera totaling 174 species in the end of 2020. They are found North, Central, and the northmost South America, much of temperate Eurasia, Japan, and extreme northern Africa, however, only Hyla is found outside the Americas. The Wikipedia is following this classification.

The AmphibiaWeb follows an older classification defining Hylinae more broadly, with several hundred species. At the end of 2020, the AmphibiaWeb lists 42 genera totaling 737 species.

Amphibian Species of the World
At the end of 2020, the Amphibian Species of the World includes the following 18 genera:

AmphibiaWeb
At the end of 2020, the AmphibiaWeb includes the following 42 genera:

Characteristics
Hylinae are largely arboreal frogs, although Smilisca and Triprion are burrowers. Eggs are deposited in water and the tadpoles are aquatic.

References

Hylidae
 
Amphibian subfamilies
Taxa named by Constantine Samuel Rafinesque